Abowinum is a community in the Ajumako Enyan Essiam District in the Central Region of Ghana.

References 

Central Region (Ghana)
Communities in Ghana